Fakes Forgeries Experts is an annual magazine on forgery in philately. It was established in 1998 and is published by Postiljonen on behalf of the Fédération Internationale de Philatélie and the International Association of Philatelic Experts. 

The first editor-in-chief was Paolo Vollmeier, followed by Knud Mohr from No. 7, 2004. The current editor-in-chief is Jonas Hällström and Knud Mohr continues as honorary editor.

References

External links
 

1998 establishments in Switzerland
Annual magazines
English-language magazines
Magazines established in 1998
Magazines published in Zürich
Philatelic periodicals
Philatelic fakes and forgeries